United Nations Security Council Resolution 499, adopted unanimously on December 21, 1981, after noting the death of International Court of Justice (ICJ) judge Abdullah El-Erain, the Council decided that elections to the vacancy on the ICJ would take place at the Security Council and at the General Assembly's thirty-sixth session.

See also
 List of United Nations Security Council Resolutions 401 to 500 (1976–1982)

References
Text of the Resolution at undocs.org

External links
 

 0499
 0499
December 1981 events